The following are the events in professional sumo during 2023.

Tournaments

Hatsu basho
Ryōgoku Kokugikan, Tokyo, 8 January – 22 January

Haru basho
Osaka Prefectural Gymnasium, Osaka, 12 March – 26 March

Natsu basho
Ryōgoku Kokugikan, Tokyo, 14 May – 28 May

Nagoya basho
Aichi Prefectural Gymnasium, Nagoya, 9 July – 23 July

Aki basho
Ryōgoku Kokugikan, Tokyo, 10 September – 24 September

Kyushu basho
Fukuoka Kokusai Center, Kyushu, 12 November – 26 November

News

January
4: Former sekiwake Toyonoshima, who had retired from professional sumo in April 2020, quits as a member of the Sumo Association in order to pursue a tarento career.
6: Yokozuna Terunofuji withdraws from the upcoming January tournament—his second straight absence from an entire basho—as he continues to recover from surgery on both of his knees.
14: Former sekiwake Okinoumi retires, ending an 18-year career in professional sumo competition. He withdrew from the January 2023 basho the previous day after he was defeated in his first five matches.
22: The top division championship is won by  Takakeishō, who defeats maegashira 13 Kotoshōhō in the final bout. Both wrestlers had come into the final day with identical 11–3 records. It is Takekeishō's third career championship and first since November 2020, and puts him in a strong position to seek promotion to yokozuna in the following tournament. Kotoshōhō, who had not produced a kachi-koshi or winning record since March 2022, wins his first Fighting Spirit Prize. He shares runner-up honours with Kiribayama, who also finishes on 11–4 and wins his first Techinque Prize. Ōnoshō, who led the tournament outright on Day 12 at 10–2, finishes on 10–5 and misses out on a share of the Fighting Spirit Prize after defeat to Hōshōryū. Former ōzeki Shōdai, who was hoping to return to the rank by scoring at least ten wins, can only manage a 6–9 record. Another former ōzeki, Asanoyama, wins the jūryō division championship with a 14–1 record.
25: Promotions to the jūryō division are announced. The winner of the makushita division title, two-time high school yokozuna Ochiai, is promoted just one tournament after making his professional debut as a makushita tsukedashi entrant. The winner of the 2022 All Japan Corporate Sumo Championship, Ochiai is the first new sekitori for Miyagino stable since the former Hakuhō took over as stablemaster. The other jūryō debutant is 29-year-old  from Mongolia, who is the brother-in-law of Tamawashi. There are also two wrestlers returning to  – Tokushōryū after just one tournament, and Tomokaze, who returns for the first time since a long injury layoff beginning in November 2019 saw him drop from the top division down to jonidan.
28: The retirement ceremony for the 69th yokozuna Hakuhō is held at the Ryōgoku Kokugikan. He performs the yokozuna dohyō-iri, or ring entering ceremony, for the last time with ōzeki Takakeishō and sekiwake Hōshōryū serving as the tachimochi (sword bearer) and tsuyuharai (dew sweeper), respectively. About 300 people take turns to cut the ōichōmage bun.
29: The retirement ceremony for former maegashira Toyohibiki is held at the Ryōgoku Kokugikan.

February
1: Ikazuchi (former komusubi Kakizoe) officially takes over the stable previously owned by Irumagawa (former sekiwake Tochitsukasa) ahead of the latter reaching Sumo's mandatory retirement age of 65 at the end of April. The renamed Ikazuchi stable is the first incarnation of the stable in over six decades.
4: The NHK charity sumo tournament is held at the Ryōgoku Kokugikan for the first time in three years. It was cancelled in 2021 and 2022 due to the COVID-19 pandemic.
11: The retirement ceremony for former komusubi Shōhōzan is held at the Ryōgoku Kokugikan.
27: The Sumo Association releases the banzuke for the March 2023 tournament in Osaka, also known as the Haru (spring) basho. There is no change in the top two ranks, with yokozuna Terunofuji expected to return to action after missing two tournaments (he would later withdraw), and the January champion—ōzeki Takakeishō—seeking to join him at sumo's top rank with a strong March performance. January runner-up Kiribayama is elevated to sekiwake for the first time in his career. Daieishō and Tobizaru, who were both demoted from komusubi for the January tournament, return to that rank for March. The top division sees three new faces: Kinbōzan, who enters makuuchi after just eight tournaments in professional sumo and is the first top division wrestler in history from Kazakhstan, Mongolian-born Hokuseihō, who was encouraged to enter sumo by his now-stablemaster Miyagino, and nine-year sumo veteran Bushōzan. One other wrestler, Daishōhō, returns to the top division for the first time since November 2019. Asanoyama, who has been climbing the sumo ladder again since completing his one-year (six tournament) suspension and had won the jūryō title in January, just misses promotion to makuuchi and is ranked at jūryō 1 for March.

March
2: Daisuke Miyakura (former sandanme Kotokantetsu) files a lawsuit against the Japan Sumo Association and his former stablemaster Sadogatake (former sekiwake Kotonowaka) seeking over ¥4.1 million in monetary damages. Among his claims, the 25-year-old says he was forced to retire when he was told he could not withdraw from the January 2021 sumo tournament because of his concerns over contracting COVID-19. This occurred shortly after the Japanese government declared its second state of emergency over the virus in Tokyo and surrounding prefectures. Miyakura also alleges mistreatment of lower-division wrestlers in Sadogatake stable.
10: Terunofuji withdraws from the March 2023 tournament, one day after stablemaster Isegahama suggested that there was "still something missing" upon observing the training of his Mongolian yokozuna. Terunofuji underwent knee surgery last October and has not participated in a professional sumo match since Day 9 of the September 2022 basho.
18: Ōzeki Takakeishō withdraws on Day 7 of the March 2023 basho after three losses, ending his bid for promotion to sumo's top rank. He had suffered a left knee injury during his Day 3 victory over Shōdai, which he aggravated when losing to Mitakeumi on Day 6. Takakeishō's withdrawal leaves the sumo tournament with no competing yokozuna or ōzeki for the first time since the start of the Shōwa era in 1926.

April
The spring jungyō'' (regional tours) are scheduled to be held at the following locations:
2: Ise Shrine, Mie (Ceremonial tournament)
3: Minoh, Osaka
4: Okazaki, Aichi
5: Inazawa, Aichi
6: Fukui
8: Jōetsu, Niigata
9: Nagano
15: Fujisawa, Kanagawa
16: Machida, Tokyo
17: Yasukuni Shrine, Tokyo (Ceremonial tournament)
22: Yokohama, Kanagawa
23: Takasaki, Gunma
28: Narita, Chiba
29: Kawasaki, Kanagawa
30: Kamisu, Ibaraki

Deaths

See also
Glossary of sumo terms
List of active sumo wrestlers
List of years in sumo

References

Sumo by year
Sumo
2023 sport-related lists
Sumo